Yüksek Hızlı Tren is the high-speed rail service of the Turkish State Railways.

YHT may also refer to:
Youth Health Team
 Haines Junction Airport, a Canadian airport
 Yangon Heritage Trust